Cellastic or celastic may refer to:

 Cellastic, tyres on the M39 Pantserwagen armoured car
 Cellastic, a protective material based on human cell structure invented by Lasse Hessel
 Celastic, a modelling material; See Ree Morton

See also
 Silastic, a flexible, inert silicone elastomer